This is a list of U.S. Army posts in Kosovo

Kosovo
 Camp Bondsteel
 Camp Monteith (since transferred to Kosovo)
 Film City, Pristina

See also
 List of United States Army installations
 List of military bases

Military of Kosovo